Wilaiwan Kunlapha (born 25 December 1987) is a Thai road cyclist, who currently rides for UCI Women's Continental Team . She represented her nation at the 2009 UCI Road World Championships.

References

External links
 

Wilaiwan Kunlapha
Living people
Place of birth missing (living people)
1987 births
Southeast Asian Games medalists in cycling
Wilaiwan Kunlapha
Competitors at the 2013 Southeast Asian Games
Wilaiwan Kunlapha